"Dammit Janet" is a song/musical number in the original 1973 British musical stage production, The Rocky Horror Show as well as its 1975 film counterpart The Rocky Horror Picture Show, book, music and lyrics by Richard O'Brien, musical arrangements by Richard Hartley.

The number provides well known audience participation moments and has entered the popular culture lexicon through the often quoted phrase "Dammit, Janet!"

Overview
The first scene of both the stage production and film open to a wedding scene with the two main characters, Brad Majors and Janet Weiss, in attendance. In the motion picture, a repressive Gothic setting, backs up the young couple in their chorus with the American Gothic characters themselves. Brad and Janet are portrayed as sexually uptight. The song is performed in this deliberate awkwardness, setting up the characters as naive and innocent.

The scene is reminiscent of the opening scene of the horror classic Night of the Living Dead (1968). Several comparisons of Rocky Horror with Night of the Living Dead have been made by authors such as Roberta E. Pearson and Philip Simpson in their book, Critical Dictionary of Film and Television Theory, as well as J. Hoberman and Jonathan Rosenbaum in the book, Midnight Movies. Costumes for the two characters in this scene are nearly identical to those of the two main characters from the film What's Up, Doc? (1972).

The song is an awkward musical marriage proposal by Brad to Janet, after both have attended the wedding of two high school friends, just before setting off to visit their high school science teacher. The music for the song exaggerates the Rock-N-Roll tendency to repeat simple chord progressions.

The song is in the key of B♭ major.

Musical number 

"Dammit Janet" is the second number in the stage production following the prologue, and is performed as a duet. Act One, Scene 1 opens directly on Brad and Janet as they are waving goodbye to newly wedded friends Ralph and Betty Hapschatt. For the film, the exterior location was an American-style small-town church. The original film script refers to it as the Denton Catholic Church, but as seen in the final film, it is the Denton Episcopal Church.

A notable aspect of the film production for this number is the cemetery next to the church with a billboard in the distance for comical effect. It depicts a large heart with an arrow through it with the words, "Denton, the Home of Happiness". Brad and Janet stand on opposite sides of the screen with the cemetery in the background and the billboard far in the back, but directly between each character as the song begins.

Beginning in an awkward and uncertain proclamation by Brad that he "Has something to say". Janet awaits, clutching the bridal bouquet she just caught. In musical rhythm, he tells Janet that he really loves "the skillful way" she beat the other girls to the bride's bouquet.

He professes his love with metaphors of deep rivers and the future, all accompanied by the church staff dressed exactly as characters from the classic painting American Gothic by Grant Wood. The back-up throughout the stage play was a cast of "chorus" singers credited as "Phantoms".

The scene in the movie begins to change. As the number progresses, we follow the couple into the church while the caretaker and staff begin to prepare for a funeral. They spin the white flower arrangements around to show that they are black on the other side, and a casket is carried in and placed in front of them just as Brad and Janet kiss.

Reception
The song is considered to be one of the top "heartfelt" movie moments. Further, the words "Damn it, Janet" are seen as an immortal part of cinematic history.

Along with the characters of The Rocky Horror Picture Show, the phrase "Dammit, Janet!" has entered the pop culture lexicon. The phrase has become so ingrained in society that thirty years after first singing the song for the film, American actor Barry Bostwick told an interviewer "For as long as I live, people will be coming up to me and asking me to say, "Dammit, Janet. I love you."

In popular culture

 In 1996, the Scottish-rooted band Choke released an extended play record entitled Damn It Janet.
 In 2000, UK musicians Pants & Corset released an Audio CD entitled Dammit Janet.
 For the film's 25th anniversary in 2000, 20th Century Fox licensed a greeting card featuring the signature lip logo of The Rocky Horror Picture Show on the cover and a picture in the inside of Brad holding Janet and saying Dammit, Janet! Pull yourself together. It's only a birthday card! Happy Birthday, you... you monster!
 The second season of the Fox animated sitcom Family Guy, titled "Dammit Janet!", follows Stewie falls in love with a girl in his preschool class named Janet.
 The song was covered by Cory Monteith and Lea Michele on the Fox musical television series Glee as part of the second season tribute episode "The Rocky Horror Glee Show".
 It was covered by Ryan McCartan and Victoria Justice on the 2016 film remake The Rocky Horror Picture Show: Let's Do the Time Warp Again.
 An episode of the 2019 Hulu original series Reprisal'' features the characters Katherine and Bash lip-synching to the song.

References

External links 
 

1973 songs
Songs from Rocky Horror
Songs with music by Richard Hartley (composer)
Songs with lyrics by Richard O'Brien
Male–female vocal duets
Victoria Justice songs